Cudmore is a national park in Central West Queensland, Australia, 844 km northwest of Brisbane. The terrain of the park has an elevation of 398 meters.

Wildlife 
166 species of animals and 147 species of plants have been recorded in the park. The most endangered on the list of plants is Drummond Range bloodwood (Corymbia clandestina). Among the rare or endangered mammals in the park are the central greater glider and koala.

References

See also

 Protected areas of Queensland

National parks of Queensland
Protected areas established in 1998
Central West Queensland